Pržno is a municipality and village in Frýdek-Místek District in the Moravian-Silesian Region of the Czech Republic. It has about 1,100 inhabitants.

Geography
Pržno lies in the historical region of Cieszyn Silesia. The municipality is located in the Moravian-Silesian Foothills on the right bank of the Ostravice River.

History
The first written mention of Pržno is from 1573. It was then a part of the Friedeck state country that was split from the Duchy of Teschen in 1573.

After World War I and fall of Austria-Hungary it became a part of Czechoslovakia. In March 1939 it became a part of Protectorate of Bohemia and Moravia. After World War II it was restored to Czechoslovakia.

References

External links

 

Villages in Frýdek-Místek District
Cieszyn Silesia